Guillermo García-López and Albert Montañés were the defending champions, but only García-López chose to participate this year. He played with Rainer Schüttler. However, they lost to Marco Chiudinelli and Jo-Wilfried Tsonga already in the first round.
3rd seeds Marc López and Rafael Nadal won this event, by defeating Daniele Bracciali and Andreas Seppi 6–3, 7–6(7–4) in the final.

Seeds

Draw

Draw

References
 Main Draw

Doubles